Pokhlyobin is a rural locality (a khutor) in Mayorovskoye Rural Settlement, Kotelnikovsky District, Volgograd Oblast, Russia. The population was 282 as of 2010. There are 10 streets.

Geography 
Pokhlyobin is located in steppe, on the bank of the Tsimlyansk Reservoir, 18 km northwest of Kotelnikovo (the district's administrative centre) by road. Safronov is the nearest rural locality.

References 

Rural localities in Kotelnikovsky District